Henry Charles Lahee (July 2, 1856, in London–1953) was an author on music. He wrote several comprehensive biographical reference works on musicians.

From 1891 to 1899, he served as secretary of the New England Conservatory of Music.

Education
Lahee studied at St Michael's College, Tenbury and Nautical Training College in Greenhithe.

Publications

References

External links
 
 

1856 births
1953 deaths
American male non-fiction writers
American writers about music
19th-century American non-fiction writers
19th-century American male writers
20th-century American non-fiction writers
20th-century American male writers
People from London